Chestnut Ridge School District is a school district in Bedford County, Pennsylvania, United States.

Extracurriculars
The district offers a variety of clubs, activities and sports.

Sports
The district funds:

 Varsity

 Boys
 Baseball - AA
 Basketball- AA
 Cross country - AA
 Football - AA
 Golf - AA
 Rifle - AAAA
 Soccer - AA
 Track and field - AA
 Wrestling - AA

 Girls
 Basketball - AA
 Cheer - AAAA
 Cross country - A
 Golf - AA
 Rifle - AAAA
 Soccer (fall) - A
 Softball - AAA
 Tennis - AA
 Track and field - AA
 Volleyball - AA

Middle school sports:

 Boys
 Baseball
 Basketball
 Football
 Wrestling	

 Girls
 Basketball
 Softball
 Volleyball

According to PIAA directory July 2015

References

External links
 Chestnut Ridge School District
 PIAA

School districts in Bedford County, Pennsylvania
School districts established in 1952